Pisinna is a genus of gastropods belonging to the family Anabathridae.

The genus has almost cosmopolitan distribution.

Species:

Pisinna albizona 
Pisinna angulata 
Pisinna angustata 
Pisinna approxima 
Pisinna asymmetrica 
Pisinna bicincta 
Pisinna bicolor 
Pisinna boucheti 
Pisinna brunescens 
Pisinna cadus 
Pisinna castella 
Pisinna cazini 
Pisinna chasteri 
Pisinna circumlabra 
Pisinna colmani 
Pisinna columnaria 
Pisinna compressa 
Pisinna costata 
Pisinna crawfordi 
Pisinna cyclostoma 
Pisinna dubitabilis 
Pisinna eurychades 
Pisinna flindersi 
Pisinna frauenfeldi 
Pisinna glabrata 
Pisinna gradata 
Pisinna hipkinsi 
Pisinna impressa 
Pisinna incipiens 
Pisinna insulana 
Pisinna jacosa 
Pisinna juddi 
Pisinna kershawi 
Pisinna kis 
Pisinna koruahina 
Pisinna lara 
Pisinna laseroni 
Pisinna manawatawhia 
Pisinna megastoma 
Pisinna micronema 
Pisinna minor 
Pisinna missile 
Pisinna moretonensis 
Pisinna ngatutura 
Pisinna nitida 
Pisinna oblata 
Pisinna olivacea 
Pisinna paucirugosa 
Pisinna perdigna 
Pisinna polysulcata 
Pisinna ponderi 
Pisinna praecidecosta 
Pisinna rekohuana 
Pisinna rekominor 
Pisinna rufoapicata 
Pisinna rugosa 
Pisinna salebrosa 
Pisinna semiplicata 
Pisinna semisulcata 
Pisinna stampinensis 
Pisinna subfusca 
Pisinna subrufa 
Pisinna subtilicosta 
Pisinna tasmanica 
Pisinna tropica 
Pisinna tumida 
Pisinna varicifera 
Pisinna verticostata 
Pisinna vincula 
Pisinna voorwindei 
Pisinna zosterophila

References

Gastropods